Gruna is a municipality and village in Svitavy District in the Pardubice Region of the Czech Republic. It has about 200 inhabitants.

Administrative parts
The village of Žipotín is an administrative part of Gruna.

References

External links

Villages in Svitavy District